The Usedomer Bäderbahn (UBB) with its head office in Heringsdorf, northeastern Germany, is a 100 percent-owned subsidiary of the German national railway, Deutsche Bahn and the owner and operator of the railway network on the island of Usedom as well as the Züssow–Wolgast and Velgast–Barth lines. It refers to all the lines on which it runs services – i.e. Züssow–Stralsund–Velgast – as the Vorpommernbahn or “West Pomeranian Railway”.

The UBB is a member of the Fare Association of Federal and Non-Federal Railways in Germany (Tarifverband der Bundeseigenen und Nichtbundeseigenen Eisenbahnen in Deutschland) or TBNE, albeit without voting rights, because it belongs to Deutsche Bahn.

Network

Current services

References

Sources 

 Horst-Werner Dumjahn: Handbuch der deutschen Eisenbahnstrecken, Mainz 1984 Nachdruck der Eröffnungsdaten 1835–1935 herausgegeben Berlin 1935

External links 

 Official Internet presence of the Usedomer Bäderbahn 
 DB Press release: 1st cut of the spade for the railway extension to Swinemünde 
 Rolling stock list 

Deutsche Bahn
Railway companies of Germany
Usedom
Companies based in Mecklenburg-Western Pomerania
Transport in Mecklenburg-Western Pomerania
Railway companies of Poland